Kerry Weaver is a fictional character from the NBC television series ER. The role was portrayed by Laura Innes who debuted as a recurring character in the second season episode "Welcome Back, Carter!", which aired on September 21, 1995. Innes was promoted to the role of a series regular as of the third-season episode "Dr. Carter, I Presume", which aired on September 26, 1996 and made her last regular appearance in the thirteenth-season episode "A House Divided", which aired on January 11, 2007.

During the series' fifteenth season, Innes made guest appearances in the episodes "Heal Thyself", which aired on November 13, 2008, and the series finale, "And in the End...", which aired on April 2, 2009.

Very little of Weaver's background was revealed to the audience in early appearances. The character exhibits a limp in her gait, which is aided by the use of a forearm crutch. This was later revealed to be caused by congenital hip dysplasia in episode 14 of season 11, in addition to the fact that she had lived for a period in Africa.

Weaver arrived at County General as Chief Resident and later became an attending physician. She was promoted to Chief of Emergency Medicine and finally Hospital Chief of Staff. Her administrative position often forced her to make unpleasant decisions that drew hostility from her fellow physicians, as when she fired Jeanie Boulet in Season 4. Although an excellent physician, she is often portrayed as the villain in many episodes, prioritizing herself and her career over the well-being of other ER workers and even patients. Her behavior is often hypocritical, condescending, and arrogant.

Having had some heterosexual relationships, Weaver eventually came out as a lesbian. Her sexual orientation was a key point in some episodes, particularly when she fought in court to keep her son, Henry. She was included in AfterEllen.com's Top 50 Lesbian and Bisexual Characters.

Seasons two through six 
During Innes' first five seasons on the show, little was revealed about the details of Weaver's background which would later become some of her defining traits: her sexual orientation, political beliefs, and even the precise nature of her disability. These were closely guarded secrets for a woman who wanted to succeed professionally, but feared discrimination. She was also unable to fully deal with her internalized homophobia and regretted that she never knew her birth parents.

When she was first hired by Mark Greene as chief resident in 1995, this disappointed much of the ER staff who didn't care for her micro-management in trauma rooms. Early in her position, she would often clash with Doug Ross and resident Susan Lewis over most of the procedures in patient care. In addition, her strong belief in administrative policies would be dragged out into every unnecessary aspect in the workplace (in one episode, Jerry, the desk clerk, brought cake celebrating her day off). In Season 3, Kerry became an ER attending physician alongside Mark Greene, whom she would always manage to compete with or maneuver to catch the eye of her superiors.

As a result, it was difficult for anyone — the audience or any of the other characters — to really know Weaver beyond her tough and bureaucratic professionalism. In an early glimpse into her soul, Weaver defended Jeanie Boulet, played by Gloria Reuben, a physician assistant who contracted HIV from her adulterous husband. Later Boulet contracts Hepatitis C from a needle stick accident involving an infected patient. She fought to keep her job and dignity, while some doctors worried about the liability involved in having an HIV-positive employee in the ER.  Weaver was the first person in a position of power to side with Jeanie, and the two remained friends until Jeanie's budget-related firing and her successful pressure campaign to get her job back. They reconciled and were close friends again when Jeanie left the ER to be with her new husband and raise her adopted HIV-positive son, Carlos.

Weaver demonstrated a great deal of compassion and a moral commitment to civil rights, and that helped her and Dr. Greene draft an ER policy for HIV-positive employees. This storyline developed Weaver's character beyond that of a stoic, abrasive professional. In future episodes, she agreed to look the other way when Dr. John Carter helped a teenage runaway escape her homophobic parents who sent her away to an ex-gay camp.

In 1997, Weaver went through a brief relationship with Ellis West (played by Clancy Brown), an M.D. working for the Synergix Group, which was under consideration by County for a general management contract of the ER.  Despite his claims to the contrary, she eventually came to the conclusion that West had begun a relationship with her in order to gain her approval of the contract. West said she was wrong and withdrew the proposal.

After Carter was fired from his RA position and had nowhere to live, he followed an ad which led him to Dr. Weaver's house; she had been renting out her basement apartment to college students.  For the first time, the audience saw the inside of her city home, and noted that she was single and independent, lived in a nice home, and had a particular taste in music. Weaver also hired a private investigator to locate her birth mother, an effort that initially failed and revealed Weaver's fear that she was raised by adoptive parents because her mother could not accept a disabled daughter.

In 1998, during Season 4, Kerry was briefly debilitated when an explosion at chemical plant sent victims flooding in, creating a toxic benzene spill in the ER. Weaver suffered a convulsive (Generalized Tonic Clonic or Grand Mal) seizure from the effects of the toxins. She was treated by Dr. Carter and Dr. Anna Del Amico. With Weaver debilitated and Dr. Greene out of town, Carter was forced to take charge of the ER for the first time.

Ever since her arrival at County General, Kerry had been very ambitious in pursuing higher administrative titles, such as Chief of Emergency Medicine. This was after Dr. Morgenstern's long, extensive absence, that a new position needed to be filled. For a short period she was made interim acting chief of emergency medicine until a suitable replacement was found. Yet, after an incident involving the hiring of a doctor who turned out to be a very accomplished if bizarre non-physician, Kerry's chances were luckily left open. However, she discovered that the hospital wasn't really considering her for the position. When she found out, she immediately quit as interim chief of the ER and Dr. Robert Romano jumped at the opportunity to become interim chief of the ER. At the start of Season 6, word spread that Romano might be up to the position as Chief of Staff, an event that both Kerry and Mark Greene resented and tried to prevent. However, in the end Kerry backed Dr. Romano for Chief of Staff and in return she was given the position of Chief of Emergency Medicine.  This would be the first and last time Romano and Weaver completely agreed on administrative policy; in later seasons they were always involved in power struggles, despite both of them favoring administrative matters much more than the rest of the staff

In 1999, Weaver welcomed the chance to hire Dr. Gabe Lawrence (played by Alan Alda), who had been her mentor. She initially refused to accept Dr. Mark Greene's assertion that Lawrence was suffering from the early stages of Alzheimer's disease, but she ultimately faced facts and said goodbye to her role model.

Season seven 
In mid-season, Weaver fell in love with staff psychiatrist Kim Legaspi (played by Elizabeth Mitchell), but was afraid to admit it to Legaspi or herself. While Legaspi was openly lesbian and willing to pursue a romantic relationship with Weaver, she became frustrated that Weaver was not only in the closet, but also suffered from internalized homophobia and thus the relationship got off to a slow start. Once Weaver was able to admit to herself that she was gay, she was still uncomfortable about her coworkers finding out and the discriminatory consequences it might have on her career. This was despite their relationship becoming an "open secret" among most of the people in the ER. During that story, we also learned that Kerry had been married to a surgical resident before her career at County General started.

The first coworker Weaver came out to was Dr. Robert Romano, who planned to fire Legaspi over trumped up allegations that she sexually harassed a female patient. Weaver's act of courage kept Romano from firing Legaspi, but it also emotionally drained Weaver, whose fears of discrimination ruining her career resurfaced. She was therefore unable to provide emotional support to Legaspi, who kept her job, but at the cost of seeing the entrenched homophobia of the hospital administration and her own girlfriend, who remained in the closet.  Legaspi broke up with Weaver and decided to take a job offer in San Francisco rather than face the homophobia from Romano or the lack of emotional support she received from Weaver.

Kerry also ran afoul of Elizabeth Corday in Season 7 when she had Mark Greene evaluated for professional competency after he showed noticeable personality changes after returning from brain tumor surgery. As a result, Kerry was not invited to Elizabeth and Mark's wedding, and while she and Mark seem to mend fences in Season 8, she and Elizabeth remained mostly unfriendly. Elizabeth sympathized and the two doctors were on better terms until Dr. Corday departed the show in Season 11. They were never close friends though. In fact, Elizabeth's departure came when she deliberately performed an illegal, life-saving transplant from an HIV+ donor into an HIV+ individual and did so in large part because she knew it would anger Kerry, leading Kerry to offer a demotion that Elizabeth declines before quitting.

Season eight 
Weaver still had not come out to any of her coworkers except Romano and Luka Kovač. She was still quite anxious about anyone discovering her true status even though her sexual orientation was already known to some of her coworkers. Weaver did, however, begin a new relationship with firefighter Lt. Sandy Lopez (played by Lisa Vidal) whom she met in a rainstorm while trying to rescue a pregnant woman from a crashed ambulance. As the two became close, Lopez told Weaver she refused to date a woman who was in the closet. Lopez forcibly outed Weaver with a passionate kiss in front of her coworkers. What followed was a groundbreaking story for American network television as the development of the romance between the two women was treated with the courtship, passion and arguments often reserved for heterosexual couples.

Lopez said, "I did you a huge favor," after the kiss in the ER; a few episodes later, Weaver admitted to her that she was right. At the season's end, Weaver accepted herself as a lesbian, and became eager to combat homophobia wherever it appeared.

In Season Eight's second episode "The Longer You Stay", Weaver failed to answer repeated pages from Drs. Malucci & Chen when a patient being tended to by them had complications. Weaver was finally hauled in by Dr. Carter when he ran from the ER to get her personally from Doc Magoo's, sustaining a painful fall in the process. But after the patient died and she flatly said to the three "you killed him", she was seen back at Doc Magoo's where she found the pager she left in the bathroom stall.

Desperate to cover up her irresponsibility when the hospital was sued by the patient's family, Weaver fired Malucci in the third episode "Blood, Sugar, Sex, Magic" on a charge of misconduct, and by the fourth episode "Never Say Never", she pinned the malpractice on Malucci and Chen.

In "Bygones", Weaver was stunned when she realized a lonely young woman murdered her roommate because of unrequited love. She then reconciled with Lopez and the two of them made their first social appearance at an impromptu drinking party after Mark Greene died. Weaver was visibly saddened by Greene's death and broke down after hearing the news of his passing. She later told Sandy she knew his demise was coming but never thought it would affect her as deeply as it did. She realized she had lost a friend and regretted the years they spent in competition for various ER posts and promotions.

Season nine 
Weaver and Lopez were still together and had on-going arguments about the future of their relationship. Weaver wanted to have a child, but after suffering a miscarriage felt Lopez should carry the child. Lopez, however, did not want to get pregnant, because it would impact her firefighting career. The couple did not get much screen time that season, and Weaver was given another story thread about the consequences she faced when she failed to report a local politician who tested positive for syphilis; Alderman Johnathan Bright provided funding for County and a plum position for Kerry, but forced her to do an off-the-record treatment of his closeted gay lover that ended with the lover's accidental death from an allergic reaction to penicillin. Later, Dr. Anspaugh became fed up with Dr. Romano's attitude and neglect on the job. Anspaugh offered to lighten Romano's work load by sharing his administrative duties with Kerry Weaver. When Romano refused this, he was replaced with a somewhat surprised Weaver, who offered Romano the Chief of Emergency Medicine position.

Season ten 
Kerry settled into her chief administrative position but ran into various challenges that arose day by day from hospital staffing to the ER's hectic renovation. These obstacles included her constant run-ins with Dr. Romano, whom at one point she threatens to fire. When he was killed in a helicopter accident, Kerry, like many others, was not saddened, though she acknowledged that his presence was an important contribution to the hospital. Later in early 2004, Weaver dedicated a Center of LGBT healthcare in the memory of Romano, which secretly served as post-mortem payback, since Romano was not a supporter of gay rights. In her personal life, Lopez changed her mind about having a baby and gave birth to baby Henry in the hospital. Later on in the season, however, Lopez died from injuries she suffered while fighting a fire; Kerry was  devastated by the loss. Abby Lockhart and (surprisingly) Elizabeth Corday were particularly supportive towards her following this tragedy. Sandy's parents (who had never approved of her sexual orientation) took custody of Henry and for the remainder of the season, Weaver's storyline focused on a child custody battle between herself and Lopez's parents. The custody situation was eventually settled when the Lopezes and Weaver agreed to her having primary custody, with the Lopezes taking care of Henry while Kerry was at work.

Season eleven 
In the 2005 episode titled "Just As I Am," Weaver finally met her biological mother, Helen Kingsley, who turned out to be a conservative Christian, originally from Myrtle Beach, South Carolina and currently living in Terre Haute, Indiana. Kingsley (Frances Fisher) explained to Weaver that, as an unmarried, teenage mother with limited options for raising a child, she gave Weaver up for adoption when she was 14 days old in hopes of her having a better life. She was in town for a Christ Crusade and decided to meet her daughter since Kerry's biological father, Cody Boone, had recently died. When Kingsley learned her daughter was a lesbian, she and Weaver clashed over faith and sexuality, with Weaver insisting that her mother love and accept her. Kingsley said she could love her daughter, but because she could not accept homosexuality as moral, she could not accept her daughter.  This episode not only ended the mystery behind Weaver's mother, it also revealed for the first time the reason for Weaver's crutch: Helen inquired about Weaver's limp, and Weaver explained that she suffered from congenital hip dysplasia, a birth defect.  Weaver was surprised to learn that Helen knew nothing about it, and her long-held fear that the birth defect was the reason she was given up for adoption was resolved.

Aside from this episode, Kerry Weaver almost exclusively played supporting roles and was frequently absent from entire episodes. A negative contribution was that she played a major role in forcing Elizabeth Corday to leave County, though Corday deliberately provoked her into doing so because she could not work with Lucien Dubenko, a new surgeon that Weaver had hired.

Season twelve 
Kerry continued to play the background in most of the episodes this season. Even though she stayed very busy with her administrative meetings and tasks, Kerry occasionally took shifts in the ER to keep her emergency skills sharp. In the episode "Out on a Limb" Kerry finally underwent surgery to fix her hip dysplasia. In the episode "No Place To Hide," Kerry walked for the first time on the series without the aid of her forearm crutch.  Kerry asked Abby (who was expecting a child with Luka) to be Henry's legal guardian in the event that something happened to her, but her surgery was entirely successful. (Reportedly, this storyline was done, at least in part, because Laura Innes really was starting to develop hip and back problems after ten years of walking with a fake limp for the sake of her role.)  Laura Innes described this arc as the character "shedding some of her hardness and moving on in her life."

At the end of the season, Kerry faced criticism for hiring Dr. Victor Clemente (John Leguizamo) as an attending physician, who compromised patient care leading to possible liability and lawsuits to the hospital.  Despite being responsible for hiring him (and for defending him against Luka's protests when Clemente began causing trouble), Kerry tried to divert the fire towards Dr. Luka Kovač (Goran Visnjic), the Chief of Emergency Medicine, risking his job as a result.

Season thirteen 
After saving Luka and Abby in the season premiere, Kerry realized that her constant attempts to protect her career had cost her friendships; she owned up to her responsibility for the Clemente incident in order to save Luka from being fired. She was demoted from Chief of Staff as a result and was back to being an attending physician. Though she clearly struggled to adjust to her new position, especially with the current ER chief Luka Kovač now being her boss, Kerry was pleased to practice medicine full-time again; she also developed a more friendly relationship with Greg Pratt.

Working back in the ER, Weaver caught the eye of a TV producer filming a news segment with Dr. Morris and literally steals the show. She's offered a job by the executives for news reporting. Shortly afterwards, Kerry and her producer Courtney (Michelle Hurd) developed a close relationship, one Kerry had not felt since her partner Sandy Lopez died. Courtney told Kerry how her great news broadcasting could open a successful career for her.  Kerry decided to leave County General when ER chief Luka Kovač had to enact budget cuts and eliminate an attending position. Kerry accepted a television show offer at WTVJ in Miami, despite Kovač's last-minute efforts to convince her to stay.

Kerry Weaver's last regular appearance on ER was in the Season 13 episode called "A House Divided" Episode 280 in which Abby Lockhart expressed to Dr. Weaver that if it had not been for her, she'd never have become a doctor or a mother; she and Kerry shared a tearful farewell moment. As Kerry packed up and walked out of County General's doors for the last time, she only asked Luka to take care of the place for her and advised him not to make her mistake-getting involved in hospital politics, indicating that she forgave him.  Luka took her advice and stepped down as Chief towards the end of the season, just before he married Abby.

Laura Innes' last appearance as a series regular on the show was on January 11, 2007. Following her departure from the program, NBC received some pressure from GLAAD to introduce more LGBT characters.

Return to the series in the fifteenth season and the end 
Weaver appeared in a flashback sequence in the Season 15 episode titled "Heal Thyself", which was set back in 2002, just months before Greene's death. In her scene, she walked into Trauma 1 and expressed how worried she was about Dr. Mark Greene, because of his treatment for brain cancer. She told him to step down and take a break from treating Catherine Banfield's son. After he refused, Dr. Weaver reluctantly left the room.

At the end of the Season 15 episode "The Book of Abby," long-serving nurse Haleh Adams showed the departing Abby Lockhart a closet wall where all the past doctors and employees had put their locker name tags. Among them, the tag "Weaver" was seen.

During Season 15 episode 19, former co-worker Dr. Doug Ross asked both Sam Taggart and Neela Rasgotra about Weaver (as he found out that they were from County), curious if she was still working there.

In the series finale, she flew from Florida to attend the dedication and opening of the Carter Center. She met up with Elizabeth Corday, Susan Lewis, John Carter, and Peter Benton after Carter's opening. The old colleagues went out to eat at an old tavern and catch up with each other. At the end of the night, she then told the group that she couldn't stay any longer, as she needed to catch a flight back to Florida. Kerry gave everyone a hug and left Chicago.

Positions held at County General

References 

ER (TV series) characters
Fictional lesbians
Adoptee characters in television
Television characters introduced in 1995
Fictional female doctors
Fictional characters with musculoskeletal system disorders